Michael Summers , known professionally as Seven, is an American hip hop record producer from Kansas City, Missouri. Seven is best known for his music production work with independent recording artists Tech N9ne, XV, and Mac Lethal.

Production discography 

2006
Tech N9ne - Everready (The Religion)

2007
Tech N9ne - Misery Loves Kompany
Mac Lethal - 11:11

2008
Krizz Kaliko - Vitiligo
Prozak - Tales from the Sick
Tech N9ne - Killer
Skatterman & Snug Brim - Word On Tha Streets
Kutt Calhoun - Feature Presentation

2009
Tech N9ne - Sickology 101
Krizz Kaliko - Genius
Tech N9ne - K.O.D.
Big Scoob - Monsterflik

2010
Brotha Lynch Hung - Dinner and a Movie
Kutt Calhoun - Raw and Un-Kutt
Tech N9ne - The Gates Mixed Plate
Krizz Kaliko - Shock Treatment
Tech N9ne - Seepage (EP)
Tech N9ne - The Lost Scripts of K.O.D. (EP)

2011
Brotha Lynch Hung - Coathanga Strangla
Big Scoob - Damn Fool
Tech N9ne - All 6's and 7's
Young Bleed - Preserved
Tech N9ne - Welcome to Strangeland
Mac Lethal - Irish Goodbye
Big Scoob - No Filter (EP)

2012
Prozak - Paranormal
Krizz Kaliko - Kickin' and Screamin'
Stevie Stone - Rollin' Stone
Ces Cru - 13 (EP)
Tech N9ne - Boiling Point (EP)
Tech N9ne - E.B.A.H.(EP)
Tech N9ne - Klusterfuk (EP)

2013
Brotha Lynch Hung - Mannibalector
Kutt Calhoun - Black Gold
Ces Cru - Constant Energy Struggles
Wrekonize - The War Within
Tech N9ne - Something Else
Krizz Kaliko - Son of Sam
Prozak - We All Fall Down
Tech N9ne - Therapy (EP)

2014
Tech N9ne - Strangeulation
Ces Cru - Codename: Ego Stripper
Rittz - Next to Nothing

2015
Tech N9ne - Special Effects
Stevie Stone - Malta Bend
Prozak - Black Ink
Tech N9ne - Strangeulation Vol. II
Ces Cru - Recession Proof

2016
Krizz Kaliko - Go
Rittz - Top of the Line
Big Scoob - H.O.G.
Tech N9ne - The Storm
Mac Lethal - Congratulations

2017
Ces Cru - Catastrophic Event Specialists
Murs - Captain California
Tech N9ne - Dominion
Stevie Stone - Level Up
JL - DIBKIS
Rittz - Last Call
Tech N9ne - Strange Reign
Twiztid - The Continuous Evilution of Life's ?'s 

2018
Tech N9ne - Planet
Murs - A Strange Journey Into The Unimaginable
Stevie Stone & JL - Kontra-Band
Big Scoob - Duality

2019
Tech N9ne - N9NA

2020
Tech N9ne - Enterfear

References 

Interview With Michael "Seven" Summers

 
Living people
American hip hop record producers
1980 births